The women's 50 kilometres race walk at the 2018 European Athletics Championships took place in Berlin on 7 August.

Records

Schedule

Results

Final

References

Race walk 50 W
Racewalking at the European Athletics Championships
Euro